Peter F. Buckley is an American psychiatrist and university administrator who focuses on the neurobiology and treatment of schizophrenia. He received his medical degree from the University College Dublin School of Medicine in Ireland and joined the Medical College of Georgia in 2000 as chair of the Department of Psychiatry and Health Behavior. During the period of 2010–2017 he served as dean of the college. Then he moved to Virginia Commonwealth University and was appointed dean of the school of medicine in 2017, a role in which he served until 2021. Buckley is senior author of a postgraduate textbook of psychiatry and editor-in-chief of Clinical Schizophrenia & Related Psychoses. He has published more than 500 scientific articles.
He has served as chancellor of the University of Tennessee Health Science Center in Memphis, Tennessee since February 1, 2022.

References 

American psychiatrists
Living people
Year of birth missing (living people)